Robert Stevens  was an American professional baseball player who played in one game for the 1875 Washington Nationals. He played the outfield and recorded one hit in four at-bats.

External links

Washington Nationals (NA) players
19th-century baseball players
Major League Baseball outfielders
Date of birth missing
Date of death missing